Muhammad Afifi al-Akiti (born 1976), also known as Shaykh Afifi, is the KFAS Fellow in Islamic Studies at the Oxford Centre for Islamic Studies. He is also the Islamic Centre Lecturer in Islamic Studies at the Faculty of Theology, University of Oxford, and is a Fellow of Worcester College, Oxford. He is the first Malay to be appointed to such a position in this university. Elsewhere, he is a visiting professor of Universiti Teknologi MARA in Malaysia. He has also received widespread media recognition across the globe.

In 2010, Afifi al-Akiti was appointed Privy Councillor to the State of Perak, Malaysia, by the Crown Prince of Perak, Raja Dr Nazrin Shah.

Afifi al-Akiti is listed in The 500 Most Influential Muslims since 2010. In 2009, along with Professor Muhammad Abdel Haleem and the IIIT, Afifi al-Akiti was shortlisted for the Annual UK Muslim Awards, in one of its 15 coveted Awards for Excellence, the Allama Iqbal Award for Creativity in Islamic Thought. In 2011, Afifi al-Akiti was awarded the Darjah Paduka Mahkota Perak (PMP), the Malaysian equivalent to the British CBE. In 2012, he was the sole recipient of the Darjah Dato' Paduka Cura Si-Manja Kini (DPCM) in that year's Sultan of Perak Birthday Honours List, which carries the Malaysian title of Dato'.

Education
Afifi al-Akiti, who comes from Malaysia, is trained as a theologian and philologist in both the Islamic and Western traditions: educated originally at the feet of the ulema of the Muslim world, he subsequently received a First Class degree in Scholastic philosophy and the History of science from the Queen's University Belfast, where he was awarded various scholarships to read for his Masters and Doctoral degrees at Oxford. His areas of expertise are Islamic theology, philosophy and science.

Afifi al-Akiti completed his DPhil in Medieval Arabic Philosophy from Oxford University as a Clarendon Scholar in 2008. His thesis identifies and systematically considers for the first time a group of philosophical writings, called the Madnun corpus, attributed to Islam's greatest theologian, al-Ghazali (d. 505/1111). His discoveries are based on a survey of nearly 50 medieval Arabic manuscripts. Besides acquainting scholars with this remarkable new body of source material, his three-volume study also presents a critical edition of the most advanced and technical work of this corpus, the manual on metaphysics and natural philosophy called the Major Madnun.

Defending the Transgressed
On 23 July 2005, just days after the London bombings, Afifi al-Akiti wrote Defending the Transgressed by Censuring the Reckless against the Killing of Civilians (Arabic: Mudafi' al-Mazlum bi-Radd al-Muhamil 'ala Qital Man La Yuqatil), the foreword of which was described by Gibril Haddad as a "fatwa" or a "response by a qualified Muslim scholar against the killing of civilians". Furthermore:

 Upon reading Shaykh Afifi's fatwa do not be surprised to find that you have probably never before seen such clarity of thought and expression together with breadth of knowledge of Islamic Law applied (by a non-native speaker) to define key Islamic concepts pertaining to the conduct of war and its jurisprudence, its arena and boundaries, suicide bombing, the reckless targeting of civilians, and more.

This work was first published freely available on the Internet. It was written in response to a statement issued by the radical group al-Muhajiroun, which refers to the 9/11 hijackers as the "Magnificent 19", and claims that while Muslims who live in the West are not allowed to wage war against the government, Muslims who live elsewhere do not face the same prohibition. In fact, the leader of al-Muhajiroun, Omar Bakri Muhammad, even argues that the British government had broken a supposed "covenant of security" with its Muslim citizens when it embarked on its anti-terror crackdown by introducing anti-terror legislation and indefinite detention of terror suspects. British Muslims therefore had every right to consider themselves at war with the government, he claims. Countering this argument, Afifi al-Akiti says that Omar Bakri has no authority to issue such a war directive as only a Muslim government could issue one. If a Muslim were to carry out such an attack, he would be a murderer and not a martyr or hero.

As a result of its huge online popularity, Defending the Transgressed was subsequently published as a book by Aqsa Press (Birmingham) and Warda Publications (Hellenthal, Germany) in September 2005. A year later the Defending the Transgressed appeared (as second edition) in The State We Are In  – a collection containing contributions on the same topic by other notable Muslim scholars, including the likes of Hamza Yusuf and Abdallah Bin Bayyah.  Its third edition is published in 2009 as part of the Oxford Amnesty Lectures (OAL) 2006 series, War Against Terror.

So far, Defending the Transgressed has been translated into a number of languages including German, Spanish, Albanian and Swedish.

Honours

 Commander of the Order of the Perak State Crown (PMP) (2011)
 Knight of the Order of Cura Si Manja Kini (DPCM) – Dato’ (2012)

 Knight Commander of the Order of the Crown of Selangor (DPMS) – Dato’ (2015)

References

External links
 Texts by Shaykh Muhammad Afifi al-Akiti
 Dr Afifi al-Akiti Faculty of Theology Staff Profile
 Dr Afifi al-Akiti Academia.edu Page
 OCIS Fellows' Profiles

Video links
 Anak Melayu Pertama Menjadi Pensyarah di Universiti Oxford
 Dr. Afifi al-Akiti @ Sudut Pandang Astro Awani
 The Hidden Treasure of Imam al-Ghazali
 Scholars and activists offer some wise words to the YMAG
 Buletin Utama TV3 – Bersama Dr. Afifi Al-Akiti
 New Statesman – Suicide Bombers

Press links
 Scholar Urges Ulama To Be Equipped With Other Knowledge
 Ulama Perlu Lengkapi Diri Dengan Pengetahun Lain, Kata Cendekiawan Oxford
 Penseur malaisien: Oulémas musulmans doivent apprendre les nouvelles sciences
 Muslim perlu hidupkan semula semangat penyelidikan (Berita Harian)
 Watch This Face: Dr Afifi al-Akiti (Emel, issue no. 62, Nov 2009)
 New Statesman – Suicide attacks are un-Islamic
 Syed Jaafar, Muhammad Afifi dilantik ahli majlis MAAIAMP (Utusan Malaysia)
 King, Wan Azizah join top Muslim influence list (Malaysian Insider)
 Muslim berpengaruh: Senarai Malaysia naik, Nik Aziz bukan lagi 50 teratas (Utusan Malaysia, 14 November 2010)
 Understand each other to prevent conflict (Brunei Times)

21st-century Muslim theologians
Alumni of Queen's University Belfast
Alumni of the University of Oxford
Fellows of Worcester College, Oxford
Malaysian emigrants to the United Kingdom
Living people
Academic staff of Universiti Teknologi MARA
Malaysian writers
1976 births
Academics of the Oxford Centre for Islamic Studies
Knights Commander of the Order of the Crown of Selangor